Pontiac-Témiscamingue was a former provincial electoral district in Quebec, Canada that elected members to the National Assembly of Quebec.

It was created for the 1973 election, from parts of the existing Pontiac and Témiscamingue electoral districts.  Its final election was in 1976.  It disappeared in the 1981 election and its successor electoral district was the re-created Pontiac.

Members of the National Assembly

Electoral results

External links
Election results
 Election results (National Assembly)
 Election results (Quebecpolitique.com)

Former provincial electoral districts of Quebec